Chik is a given name and surname. Notable people known by this name include the following:

Given name
Chik Tormenta (born 1984), Mexican luchadora
Chik Patrick Yue, Hong Kong engineer
Chik Mohamad Yusuf (1907 – 1975), Malaysian politician

Surname
Abdul Rahim Thamby Chik (born 1950), Malaysian politician
Jaime Chik (born 1962), Hong Kong actress
Jonathan Chik (fl. 1992–present), Hong Kong television producer, director, and writer
Muhammad Bakhtiar Wan Chik (born 1965), Malaysian politician
Raja Nong Chik (born 1953), Malaysian politician
Rosiah Chik (1931–2006), Malay singer
Sabbaruddin Chik (1941 – 2021), Malaysian politician

Middle name
Bulu Chik Baraik (fl. 2011–present), Indian politician
Tam Chik Sum (fl. 2010–2016), Hong Kong wheelchair fencer
Teungku Chik di Tiro (1836 – 1891), Indonesian guerrilla fighter

Hyphenate
Chun Chik-yu (1859 – 1936), Chinese-Hawaiian businessman
Kyung-Chik Han (1902–2000), Korean pastor 
Lee Chik-yuet (born 1954), Hong Kong social worker, lawyer, politician and businessman

See also

 Chi (surname)
 Chia (surname)
 Chic (nickname)
 Chica (name)
 Chick (nickname)
 Chick (surname)
 Chicka (disambiguation)
 Chickie (nickname)
 Chik (disambiguation)
 Chika (Igbo given name)
 Chika (Japanese given name)
 Chika (general name)
 Chip (name)
 Chin (surname)
 Chink (nickname)
 Chiu